Viviane Araújo may refer to:

Viviane Araújo (actress)
Viviane Araújo (fighter)